Glenn House may refer to:

Locations 
 Glenn House (Batesville, Arkansas), a National Register of Historic Places listing in Independence County, Arkansas
 Glenn House (Cape Girardeau, Missouri)
 Hugh Glenn House, The Dalles, Oregon
 Dr. John Glenn House, Jenkinsville, South Carolina, a National Register of Historic Places listing in Fairfield County, South Carolina
 Mollie and Neel Glenn House, Springfield, Tennessee, a National Register of Historic Places listing in Robertson County, Tennessee
 Abram Glenn House, Triune, Tennessee, a National Register of Historic Places listing in Williamson County, Tennessee

People 
 TJ House, full name Glenn Anthony House (born 1989), American baseball player

See also
 Glenn-Thompson Plantation, Pittsview, Alabama, a National Register of Historic Places listing in Russell County, Alabama
 Glenn Cottage Tract, Maud, Kentucky, a National Register of Historic Places listing in Washington County, Kentucky